The Oceania U20 Athletics Championships is an athletics competition organized by the Oceania Athletics Association (OAA) open to under-20 athletes from member and associate member associations. It was called the Oceania Junior Athletics Championships from 1994 to 2014. The competition is held biennially together with the Oceania Open Championships for the first time in 1994 until 1998, and again since 2010.  In 2012, the new regional "East–West" format was applied with Medals now being awarded for athletes from both the Eastern and the Western Region by separating the results correspondingly.

Editions

Records
The list of records was compiled from various sources.

Men

Women

References
General
Oceania Championships records 23 July 2019 updated
Specific

External links
OAA website

Under-20 athletics competitions
Recurring sporting events established in 1994
Junior
 
Continental athletics championships
Biennial athletics competitions